Dorian Weber (born May 15, 1982 in Manhasset, New York) is an American rower, Paralympic silver medallist and world bronze medalist. Weber has competed in the 2013 world rowing championships in the Lwt Men's 8, 2016 Rio Paralympic Games and the 2012 London Paralympic Games. Dorian Weber is the only athlete to have medaled in rowing as both an able bodied and Para athlete at the senior level. 

Currently is a licensed Realtor and Investor in South Florida.

References

External links
Dorian Weber at usrowing.org

1982 births
Living people
People from Manhasset, New York
American male rowers
World Rowing Championships medalists for the United States
Medalists at the 2016 Summer Paralympics
Paralympic medalists in rowing
Paralympic silver medalists for the United States
Rowers at the 2016 Summer Paralympics
Paralympic rowers of the United States